Gongzhucuo (Tibetan: གུང་རྒྱུད་མཚོ, Mandarin Chinese: 公珠错) is a lake situated on a plateau in Ngari Prefecture of Tibet Autonomous Region in China.

Location 
It covers an area of 66.2 square kilometers. The average annual temperature is 0-2 ℃ and the average annual precipitation is 200–300 mm. The water to the lake is mainly supplied by surface runoff.

China National Highway 219 passes through the north bank of the lake.

References

Lakes of Tibet
Ngari Prefecture